Lucas Daniel Cavallini (born December 28, 1992) is a Canadian professional soccer player who plays as a forward for Liga MX club Tijuana and the Canada national team.

Early life
Cavallini was born in Canada to an Argentinian father and a Canadian mother. He played youth soccer in Canada with Club Uruguay, Weston SC, NY Hearts, and Clarkson Sheridan SC. He left Canada at age 16 and went to South America to develop his soccer talents.
He began playing for Nacional's youth development squads in 2010 in Montevideo, Uruguay.

Club career

Nacional
In June 2011, he participated in the 2011 U-20 Copa Libertadores. In the first game, Nacional beat Libertad 1–0 with a goal by Romero. In the second match, they beat Jorge Wilstermann 3–1 with goals from Bueno, Marchelli and again Romero. In the third and final game, Nacional drew 0–0 with Universitario, and qualified for the quarterfinals. On June 20, they were defeated by Mexican side América 1–0, which led to their elimination.

His development in the youth squad lead him to sign a senior contract with the club in early 2012.

Loan to Juventud
In mid-July 2012, he was loaned to Juventud de Las Piedras to make his professional debut and have more chances in the first team.  In his second match with the club, he scored his first official goal in the 1–0 home victory against Central Español. On October 7, he was the man of the match against Bella Vista, assisting and scoring a goal in his team's 2–0 victory. His third goal came six days later, in a 1–1 away draw against Fénix.

CA Fénix
After a slow start during his first season on loan with C.A. Fénix, Cavallini emerged as the club's most prolific goal scorer in the Apertura of the 2014–15 Uruguayan Primera División season. He joined them permanently before the start of the 2015 Apertura.

Peñarol
Cavallini joined Peñarol on January 10, 2017. He scored his first goal against Montevideo Wanderers on February 26. He was loaned to Liga MX side Puebla on August 31, 2017.

Puebla
Cavallini was loaned to Liga MX side Puebla on August 31, 2017, becoming the first Canadian to play in Mexico's top tier since Isidro Sánchez Macip in 2010. He debuted for the club against Cruz Azul on September 9, coming on in the 64th minute for Félix Micolta in a 0–0 draw. He scored his first goal for Puebla against Necaxa on September 16. After scoring 13 goals in 25 matches for Puebla in the 2017–18 season, the club would sign him to a four-year contract in June 2018.

Vancouver Whitecaps FC
In December 2019, Puebla and Major League Soccer side Vancouver Whitecaps FC agreed to a transfer, with Cavallini signing a three-year deal with the club ahead of the 2020 MLS season. He made his debut in Vancouver's season-opening 3–1 loss to Sporting Kansas City on March 1, 2020. Cavallini scored his first regular-season goal for Vancouver on September 6, netting the opener in a 3–2 victory over Toronto FC In August 2022, he joined Whitecaps FC 2 on loan for a match in MLS Next Pro.

Tijuana
In February 2023, Cavallini returned to Mexico and signed with Tijuana. On February 10 he made his debut for Xolos against Atlético San Luis, coming on as a substitute in an eventual 1-0 victory. Cavallini scored his first goal for Xolos on March 3 against Atlas.

International career
Cavallini launched his international career for Canada at 18 years old, debuting for the U-20 team in 2011 during the CONCACAF U-20 Championship in Guatemala. Cavallini earned three call-ups to Canada's U-23 National team. 
 	
Cavallini's performance, along with the fact that he "plays in a different type of league (down in Uruguay)", according to head coach Stephen Hart, earned him his first call up to the senior roster to face Trinidad & Tobago in a friendly match on August 13, 2012. Cavallini debuted for Canada as a second-half substitute for Terry Dunfield against Trinidad, a 2–0 victory.

Cavallini made his World Cup qualifying debut in Canada's 8–1 loss to Honduras. Following that match, he declined a call-up from interim coach Colin Miller for the 2013 Gold Cup, citing personal reasons. Then coach Benito Floro gave an interview in October 2014 where he elaborated on Cavallini, saying that he had reached out to the player and had not heard back from him. Floro however pointed out that there is a place in the team for him in the future. In May 2015, Cavallini stated in an interview with Tenfield that he regretted becoming cap-tied to Canada.

Despite his comments, Cavallini was called up to face Ghana in an October 2015 friendly. In an interview regarding his return to the national team, Cavallini stated that he never said he wouldn't play for Les Rouges again, and that his comments were wrongly translated. He mentioned that his lack of appearances were related to personal matters and timing including the birth of his daughter.

Cavallini was named to the Canadian 40-man provisional team for the 2017 CONCACAF Gold Cup by Canada coach Octavio Zambrano on June 6, 2017. He was confirmed as part of the final 23-man squad on June 27.

Cavallini scored his first goals for Canada on September 9, 2018, netting a brace in an 8–0 victory over the U.S. Virgin Islands in a CONCACAF Nations League qualifier. On May 30, 2019, Cavallini was named to the final squad for the 2019 CONCACAF Gold Cup. He scored a hat-trick in a 7–0 win over Cuba during the group stage on June 23, and had a chance to score his fourth goal from a penalty spot, but his panenka went over the crossbar. On March 29, 2021, Cavallini scored his second hat-trick with Canada, as a substitute, in an 11–0 win over Cayman Islands in the team's second 2022 World Cup qualifying match.

In July 2021 Cavallini was named to the Canadian squad for the 2021 CONCACAF Gold Cup. In November 2022, Cavallini was called-up to Canada's 26-man squad for the 2022 FIFA World Cup.

Honours 

Vancouver Whitecaps FC
 Canadian Championship: 2022

Career statistics

Club

Notes

International

Scores and results list Canada's goal tally first, score column indicates score after each Cavallini goal.

Notes

References

External links

1992 births
Living people
Soccer players from Toronto
Association football forwards
Canadian people of Argentine descent
Canadian people of Italian descent
Canadian soccer players
Canada men's youth international soccer players
Canada men's under-23 international soccer players
Canada men's international soccer players
Canadian expatriate soccer players
Uruguayan Primera División players
Liga MX players
Club Nacional de Football players
Juventud de Las Piedras players
Club Atlético Fénix players
Peñarol players
Club Puebla players
Vancouver Whitecaps FC players
Whitecaps FC 2 players
Expatriate footballers in Uruguay
Expatriate footballers in Mexico
Canadian expatriate sportspeople in Uruguay
Canadian expatriate sportspeople in Mexico
2017 CONCACAF Gold Cup players
2019 CONCACAF Gold Cup players
2021 CONCACAF Gold Cup players
2022 FIFA World Cup players
Designated Players (MLS)
Major League Soccer players
MLS Next Pro players